Rhododendron viscosum, the swamp azalea, clammy azalea or swamp honeysuckle, is a species of flowering plant in the heath family Ericaceae. It has rounded matt green leaves. In early summer it produces funnel-shaped white flowers flushed pink. The flowers have prominent stamens and are strongly fragrant.

In cultivation in the UK, Rhododendron viscosum has gained the Royal Horticultural Society’s Award of Garden Merit. It is hardy down to  but like most rhododendron species requires a sheltered position in dappled shade with acid soil that has been enriched with leaf mold.

References

 

viscosum
Flora of the Southeastern United States
Flora of the Northeastern United States
Plants described in 1753
Taxa named by Carl Linnaeus
Flora without expected TNC conservation status